Scandinavian Academy of Fashion Design, often abbreviated to SAFD, is a fashion design school in Copenhagen, Denmark. It offers a full-time three-year fashion design education, and a variety of short and summer courses.

It was formerly known as Margrethe-Skolen.

History 
The Scandinavian Academy of Fashion Design (former Margrethe-Skolen) was founded by Margrethe Glad in 1931 and is named after the school's patroness Princess Margrethe of Bourbon-Parma. The reason for SAFD's success was partly thanks to Margrethe Glad's effective social network and her travels to Paris. She first went there to renew her wardrobe, returning later to buy models for manufacturing in Copenhagen. In addition, her language knowledge and pedagogical skills helped her along. In the period when the school was established, interest in courses on textiles was high even at the existing schools but SAFD's education in cutting and sewing elegant fashion designs with an international flavor was something quite new. Similarly, the study tours to Paris she arranged for the school's students were unusual at the time.

In 1937, Margrethe Glad moved to Frederiksholms Canal, where SAFD was firmly established in the premises near the beach, and the students learned pattern cutting, sewing and draping based on French haute couture tailoring. After a few years, Margrethe Glad retired from the school, and in 1945, SAFD moved to Badstuestræde led by Inga Madsen, who died in 2008. Thereafter Christina Beckman became director of the school. From 1953 the school was located on Østergade, but in 2012 it moved back to larger and newer facilities in Badstuestræde.

The school officially changed its name in 2017 when Margrethe-Skolen became Scandinavian Academy of Fashion Design (SAFD).

SAFD is located in the heart of Copenhagen and has, for more than 85 years, trained many of the leading designers, stylists and business people in the Danish and international world of fashion. Today it is internationally known and respected, according to Createur Erik Mortensen:

“Not only having interpreted and taught about fashion, but also having insisted on inspiring students to discover the heart of all forms of creativity, fashion and aesthetics. The school has maintained an admirable level of prestige which is too high for those who intend to accept the easiest solutions.“

Graduates of SAFD have achieved great recognition and success both nationally and internationally. Amongst others, can be named: Margit Brandt, Henriette Zobel, Susanne Rutzou, Bendikte Utzon, Princess Benedikte, Rene Gurskov, Rikke Ruhwald and Bitte Kai Rand.

Her Royal Highness Princess Benedikte of Denmark is the school's protector and has established a fund from which the annual Benedikte Prize is awarded. It was an honour and a pleasure when the princess herself graduated from the school and she has kept close contact with the institution since that time.

Mission and activities 

SAFD's strength lies in its creative approach to education in design. The positive, dynamic and creative atmosphere of the school stimulates the students to develop their personality, originality and individuality. This is a development which, through fundamental, factual and creative studies, endows the graduating student with an ability to realise design projects for industry, brands or their own production.

Achieving this result demands exertion and stamina. Students have to endure hard work to gain the basic tools of the trade in order to create new forms and show originality in their designs. They must be clever enough in their sketching to give expression to both creative and technical drawings so that these can be used as guidelines in the process towards the optimal solution.

Throughout the education, the students will be challenged to exceed their own limits, to create new forms, materials handling and color combinations. The goal is through craft skills to achieve innovative and new interpretations of what already exists. Through research and design process, the students gets a basic understanding of inspiration, shape and depth, elements which are essential to move forward in the design process. The aim is that the students should be able to combine their natural creative aspect of the art, so the issues that the business will make them can be solved in a highly professional manner. At the same time, it is the students duty to contribute to modern society with innovation, quality and sustainability.

Networks and partnerships 

SAFD is a member of the network organization Danish Fashion Institute, which was founded by and for the Danish fashion industry. This means that members are helping to support the vision to strengthen the industry and get Danish fashion positioned internationally. It is also part of a strong network, where the best of Danish fashion are represented.

SAFD is also member of Danish Fashion & Textile, also known as DM&T, has been the industry's natural point since 1895, and is today a modern industry and employer organization with insight into members’ daily lives and the challenges that the industry faces.

Campus 
The main college building is in Badstuestræde 1, central Copenhagen, Strøget which is the longest pedestrian shopping streets in Europe.

Alumni 

Alumni of the college include:

 Margit Brandt, fashion designer
 Susanne Rützou, fashion designer
 Princess Benedikte, Princess of Denmark
 Princess Elisabeth, Princess of Denmark
 Lene Sand, fashion designer
 Benedikte Utzon, fashion designer

References 

Fashion schools
Education in Copenhagen
Educational institutions established in 1931
1931 establishments in Denmark
Danish fashion